Mark George Perry (born 7 February 1971) is a Scottish retired footballer who played professionally as a defender for Dundee United, Aberdeen, Ross County and Peterhead in the Scottish Football League and Scottish Premier League, as well as for Cove Rangers and Keith at Highland League level.

Playing career
Born in Aberdeen, Mark Perry began his senior career with Cove Rangers in the Highland Football League. In August 1988, Scottish Football League Premier Division club Dundee United signed him for a £3000 transfer fee. After spending four seasons playing in the youth and reserve teams and being transfer listed in April 1992, he made his competitive first team debut in a Premier Division match against Aberdeen in December 1992. He played regularly through the rest of the 1992-93 season, but less often over the following two seasons and was again transfer listed in 1994. From 1995 onwards he became more established in the team, helping the club to promotion from the First Division in 1996 after being relegated a year earlier. He also played for Dundee United in the 1997 Scottish League Cup Final defeat against Celtic. Having made over 150 appearances for United, Perry left the club on a free transfer in May 1998 following the expiry of his contract.

Perry then moved to his home-town club Aberdeen, spending the next two seasons there and picking up another League Cup runners-up medal against Celtic, in the 2000 Final. With the club unwilling to offer Perry a new contract, he had a trial with English club Notts County at the beginning of the 2000–01 season, only for it to be cut short due to injury problems at Aberdeen. He joined Ross County later in 2000 and subsequently moved to Third Division club Peterhead in February 2003. He returned to the Highland League with Keith in 2007 and retired in 2009 but later made a playing comeback with his first club, Cove Rangers, in 2013.

After football
After retiring from professional football, Perry worked as a library custodian at the University of Aberdeen.

References

External links 
 

1971 births
Footballers from Aberdeen
Living people
Scottish footballers
Dundee United F.C. players
Aberdeen F.C. players
Ross County F.C. players
Peterhead F.C. players
Scottish Premier League players
Scottish Football League players
Association football defenders
Cove Rangers F.C. players
Keith F.C. players
Highland Football League players